José Sebastián Vásquez (born September 24, 1982) is an Argentine footballer that currently plays for Persijap Jepara in the Indonesia Premier League.

References

1982 births
Living people
Association football forwards
Argentine expatriate footballers
Argentine expatriate sportspeople in Indonesia
Argentine footballers
Expatriate footballers in Indonesia
Liga 1 (Indonesia) players
Indonesian Premier League players
Deltras F.C. players
Persijap Jepara players